Blackfire is a Native American punk rock group. Composed of three siblings: two brothers and a sister, their musical style is influenced by traditional Navajo Diné music and alternative rock, with political messages about government oppression and human rights. In 2012, members formed the band Sihasin.

History

Beginnings (1989–1993) 
Blackfire was founded in 1989 in Flagstaff, Arizona by siblings Jeneda, Klee, and Clayson Benally. Their mother was a folk singer-songwriter of Russian-Polish Jewish descent, while their father, Jones Benally, was a traditional Navajo medicine man. The siblings have been playing music since "their instruments were bigger than they were." Jones and his children perform as the Jones Benally Family."

Release of EPs (1994–2001) 
In 1994, C.J. Ramone produced a 5-song EP that became their debut album released on their label Tacoho Productions.  It also included musical contributions by their father Jones and Robert Tree Cody.  In 1999, they received a NAMA nomination for Best Independent Release.

One Nation Under and Woody Guthrie Singles (2002–2003) 
By the end of 2002, they released their first LP One Nation Under. Featuring their father doing traditional vocals, the album is described as "15 passionately burning songs of struggles, resistance, and hope." The song "No Control" was used in the "New Mexico, Old Monster" episode of What's New, Scooby-Doo?. It is also the last project that Joey Ramone, who dubbed Blackfire's music as "fireball punk-rock," contributed to before he died due to lymphoma.  On the album, he provided additional voicing for the songs "What Do You See" and "Lying to Myself."  That same year, they won the NAMA Best Pop/Rock Album award.  Fleming was also nominated for Best Producer.  One Nation Under is available through Canyon Records.

In 2003, they journeyed to Essakne, Mali in northern Africa.  Their performance was included in the compilation album Festival in the Desert.  By next year, they released a two-track EP titled Woody Guthrie Singles.  The songs on the EP are called "Mean Things Happenin' in this World," a protest song dealing with issues like wars waged for fortune and encroachment of rights by the federal government, and "Indian Corn Song," a song about "political and big business corruption, the poor economy, and ends with a plea to feed the homeless and orphans."

Band members 
 Clayson Benally – percussion, vocals (1989–present)
 Jeneda Benally – bass guitar, vocals (1989–present)
 Klee Benally – vocals, guitar (1989–present)

Discography 
 Blackfire (Five-song E.P., 1994)
 Blackfire (Three-song E.P., 1998)
 One Nation Under (2001)
 Woody Guthrie Singles (2003).
 Beyond Warped: Live Music Series (CD/DVD, 2005)
 [Silence] Is A Weapon (2007)
 Anthology Of Resistance (2009)

References

Other sources

External links 
 Discography at Discogs.com
 Blackfire: Official Website 

Native American musical groups
Punk rock groups from Arizona
Sibling musical trios
Musical groups established in 1989